Arthur B. Komar (March 26, 1931 – June 3, 2011) was a theoretical physicist, specializing in general relativity and the search for quantum gravity. Arthur Komar made a significant contribution to physics as an educator, research scientist, and administrator. He had wide interests in numerous other subjects.

Education
Arthur attended Midwood High School in Brooklyn. He was a capable student and chose to specialize in physics.

Research

Princeton
Arthur's interests in physics ranged over numerous fundamental and applied concepts, including conserved quantities, space and time, and thermodynamics, notably he pursued the problem of observables in general relativity and in quantum theory. As a graduate student, he worked on the problem of invariants in general relativistic spacetimes.

In 1956, he gained his Ph.D. in physics at Princeton University with a thesis on the classical electron – a topic suggested by Fritz Rohrlich. His PhD dissertation was supervised by John Archibald Wheeler, titled Some Consequences of Mach's Principle for General Relativity.

While at Princeton, he

held the Hibben scholarship, 
wrote for the Nassau literary magazine, 
was a four-year member of the Whig-Clio senate. 
was elected to the Phi Beta Kappa Society at the end of the junior year.

It's said that John Wheeler arranged a tea-time visit for his class, which to Arthur's pleasure had the company of Albert Einstein. Throughout his scientific career, Arthur remained fond of Princeton.

Niels Bohr institute and Syracuse
His career as a physicist began at the Niels Bohr Institute in Copenhagen, and was a Fellow of the American-Scandinavian Foundation. Later in 1957, he went to Syracuse University as a postdoc to research quantum gravity - collaborating with Peter Bergmann, and remained at Syracuse as assistant professor and associate professor, until 1963 when he left to join the Physics Department at Yeshiva University in New York City.

He is known for formulating the Komar mass and Komar superpotential.

Yeshiva and National Science Foundation
From 1962 until his retirement in 1997, he was on the faculty of Yeshiva University. During

1982–83 and 1986–87, he served as program director for gravitational physics. 
1991–92, he served as a consultant with specific responsibility for the LIGO project to observe and analyze gravitational radiation. 
1968–78, he was Dean of the Yeshiva's Belfer graduate school of science, 
1978–1982, he served as chairman of the physics department, 
1983–86, he was chairman of the division of natural science,
1984–1997, he served as an adjunct professor at NYU.

Still associated with Yeshiva, Arthur took leave on three occasions to work with the National Science Foundation, as program director for gravitational physics there.

Retirement
A year following his retirement, Arthur returned to Syracuse to live with his wife, Alice Honig.

See also
History of general relativity
 Komar superpotential

Selected works

Physics

Quantum theory and relativistic theory

Conserved quantities and laws in general relativity

Observables in general relativity

Singularities in general relativity

References

External links

American relativity theorists
Quantum gravity physicists
Princeton University alumni
1931 births
2011 deaths
Yeshiva University faculty